Lidmaň is a municipality and village in Pelhřimov District in the Vysočina Region of the Czech Republic. It has about 300 inhabitants.

Administrative parts
Villages of Bohutín, Hojava and Lidmaňka are administrative parts of Lidmaň.

References

Villages in Pelhřimov District